Nelisa Mchunu (born 2 February 1992), is a South African actress, model, MC, motivational speaker and writer. She is best known for the roles in the television soap operas such as, Isithembiso, Isibaya and Uzalo as fikile.

Personal life
Mchunu was born on 2 February 1992 in Wartburg in KwaZulu-Natal, in a family with ten siblings. Her father died when she was four years old. She later grew up in Clermont, KwaZulu-Natal, South Africa, when she moved with mother at the age of 6. Her mother is a teacher. Her sister, Londeka Mchunu is also an actress. When she was in Grade 8, Nelisa and her two brothers moved to Inanda, KwaZulu-Natal to stay with her grandmother.

In the high school, she studied dramatic arts. She was enrolled with the University of Witwatersrand to study BA in Media Studies, but did not complete the course due to financial difficulties. After that, she worked as a waitress and an assistant for a PR company before entering drama.

Career
In 2015, she joined as an extra on SABC 3 television soap opera Isidingo. Then in 2016, she was invited to play the role "Fikile" in the soap opera Uzalo. Her role became highly popular, where she continued to play the role for six years until 25 May 2021. Her role was going to be killed according to the plt, but Nelisa begged not to kill the role. However, the producers finally retired the role, when it could not continue with the storyline.

After the exit, she appeared on SABC 1 soap opera Generations: The Legacy by playing the role of a disgruntled client of #Ezweni. In late 2021, she returned to the soapie Uzalo.

Filmography

References

Living people
South African television actresses
1992 births